Mien Duchateau (9 November 1904 – 28 April 1999) was a Dutch middle-distance runner. She competed in the women's 800 metres at the 1928 Summer Olympics.

References

External links
 

1904 births
1999 deaths
Athletes (track and field) at the 1928 Summer Olympics
Dutch female middle-distance runners
Olympic athletes of the Netherlands
Place of birth missing
20th-century Dutch women